The Brainerd Lakes Area Lunkers were a baseball team that played in the Northwoods League, a collegiate summer baseball league. Their home games were played at Mills Field in Brainerd, Minnesota.

History
The Lunkers were not the first Northwoods League team to play in Brainerd. From 1998 to 2002, the Brainerd Mighty Gulls played in Brainerd. The Gulls folded after the 2002 season and the current franchise entered the league as an expansion team in 2005.
 
The Blue Thunder ended operations after the 2008 season and on December 23, 2008, the Northwoods League announced that St. Cloud River Bats Owner Joel Sutherland had purchased the Brainerd Blue Thunder. 

Sutherland has owned the St. Cloud River Bats since the team’s inception into the Northwoods League in 1997. He also started the Alexandria Beetles franchise as owner in 2001, but sold the Beetles following the 2001 season. Both of those franchises continue their longstanding success in central Minnesota. The River Bats have won three Northwoods League championships in 14 seasons and have averaged better than 1,850 fans per game since 2000.  The Bats also boast the most wins in the playoffs of any team in the Northwoods League. Alexandria, a city of roughly 10,000 people, has averaged better than 1,000 fans per game in their 11-year history.

Assisting Sutherland in turning the Brainerd franchise into a thriving Northwoods League affiliate will be a staff headed by General Manager Dustin Anaas. Anaas has been involved with the Northwoods League since 2008 when he was an intern with the Madison Mallards. He joined the Lunkers for their inaugural season in 2009 as the promotional coordinator and was promoted to Assistant GM following the 2009 campaign.  Following a successful second season, he was the promoted to General Manager following the 2010 season.  This will be Anaas' third season with the Lunkers and his fourth overall season in the Northwoods League. 

On January 22, 2009, the Lunkers announced their new name, logo and blue and orange color scheme.  The term “lunker”, which is commonly used to describe a game fish that is large for its kind, was submitted twice out of the more than 800 entries in Brainerd’s name-the-team contest. In 1874, a lunker was found in the Baltic sea by a one Norwegian captain Oden. It was reported that the fish was golden bronze and weighed 724 pounds.

On the morning of December 19, 2011, the day the 2012 Northwoods League schedule was to be released, the league announced that the Lunkers had folded, citing low attendance. The Lunkers were last in the league in attendance each year from 2009 to 2011, averaging 555, 515, and 528 fans, respectively.

References

https://web.archive.org/web/20090203154023/http://northwoodsleague.com/Newsroom.asp

External links
Official site
Northwoods League

Amateur baseball teams in Minnesota
Northwoods League teams
Brainerd, Minnesota micropolitan area